Ōsaka 12th district (大阪12区 Ōsaka jūni-ku) is a single-member electoral district for the House of Representatives, the lower house of the National Diet of Japan. It is located in North-eastern Osaka and covers the cities of Neyagawa, Daitō and Shijōnawate. As of September 2012, 342,226 voters were registered district, giving its voters slightly above average vote weight.

The most recent representative from the district was LDP's Tomokatsu Kitagawa (the son of pre-reform three-member 7th district LDP Representative Ishimatsu Kitagawa). In 2012, he was one of only three Liberal Democrats in Osaka to win a district seat. He had first won the seat in the "postal privatization" election of 2005. The first incumbent was Democrat Shinji Tarutoko who had first been elected to the House of Representatives in 1993 in the 7th district for the Japan New Party. After the electoral reform, he won the new single-member 12th district three times in a row before losing it to Kitagawa in 2005. In the landslide Democratic victory of 2009, Tarutoko regained the 12th district by a solid margin. He founded his own faction (Tarutoko group, officially: Seizankai) in 2010, ran for the DPJ presidency in 2010, became DPJ vice-secretary-general in 2011 and a minister of state in the Noda Cabinet in 2012. In 2012, he only finished third behind Kitagawa and Your Party's Ryōma Ishii. Kitagawa died mid-term on 26 December 2018, triggering a by-election in April 2019. Kitagawa's nephew, Shinpei Kitagawa, ran in 2019 and 2021 but lost both times to Ishin candidate Fumitake Fujita.

List of representatives

Recent election results

References 

Politics of Osaka Prefecture
Districts of the House of Representatives (Japan)